Marcelo Ramos may refer to:

 Marcelo Ramos (footballer, born 1972), Uruguayan footballer
 Marcelo Ramos (footballer, born 1973), Brazilian footballer